Sherrod Small is an American stand-up comedian and actor.

Early life
Small was born and raised in the Bedford-Stuyvesant area of Brooklyn, New York, by his mother and two sisters. Small is a cousin of Chris Rock.

Career
Small is a regular at the Comedy Cellar and Comic Strip Live in Manhattan. Sherrod was a regular on VH1's The Best Week Ever and served as a regular guest and stand-in host of Fox News's late-night satire program Red Eye w/ Greg Gutfeld. He has appeared on Tough Crowd, Premium Blend, and The Chris Rock Show.

From 2012 to 2014, Small was an infrequent guest on the Opie and Anthony radio show. Following Anthony Cumia's firing on July 3, 2014, Small took a more regular role on its successor, Opie with Jim Norton.

On July 27, 2016, he and comedian Christian Finnegan debuted as co-hosts of Black and White, a comedy/talk show on A&E that explores issues of race relations in America. The show was cancelled in September 2016.

Filmography

Film

Television

References

External links
 

Living people
American stand-up comedians
People from Bedford–Stuyvesant, Brooklyn
African-American male comedians
Comedians from New York City
American male comedians
People from Brooklyn
1973 births
21st-century African-American people
20th-century African-American people